Ab Panguiyeh (also Romanized as Āb Pangū’īyeh, Ab Pangooeyeh, Ābpangū’īyeh, and Āb Pangūyeh; also known as Opāng) is a village in Vahdat Rural District, in the Central District of Zarand County, Kerman Province, Iran. At the 2006 census, its population was 487, in 126 families.

References 

Populated places in Zarand County